The Zimbabwe Open is a professional golf tournament held in Zimbabwe, currently played on the Sunshine Tour.

History
The tournament was first played in 1984 and from 1985 to 1992 was part of the Safari Circuit, a collection of events in Africa that were played by professionals based on the European Tour during their winter. In 1991 and 1992 the event was also part of the Challenge Tour. From 1993 it moved onto the First National Bank Tour, which was later renamed the Sunshine Tour.

When it was held in the weeks preceding the Nedbank Golf Challenge, the tournament attracted some of the world's leading players, as they used it as a warm up to the big money invitational. Past winners include major winners Vijay Singh and Nick Price who, along with Mark McNulty, is the most successful player at the event, both men having recorded three victories. Ryder Cup player Gordon J. Brand is also a past winner.

Due to economic instability in Zimbabwe the tournament lost sponsors and was cancelled prior to the 2002 event. There were many attempts to resurrect the tournament, but none were successful until 2010. The 2019 edition was also cancelled because of a lack of sponsors caused by a weak economy.

Having not been played in 2019, 2020 and 2021, it returned in 2022, sponsored by FBC Bank. It was anticipated that the event was to be added to the 2023 European Tour schedule. However, this never came to fruition.

Winners

Notes

References

External links
Sunshine Tour – official site

Safari Circuit events
Sunshine Tour events
Former Challenge Tour events
Golf tournaments in Zimbabwe
Sport in Harare
Spring (season) events in Zimbabwe
Recurring sporting events established in 1984
1984 establishments in Zimbabwe